Michael Robert Blakey (born 1975 in London, United Kingdom) is a Singapore-based British entrepreneur and technology investor who was named UK Angel Investor of the Year in 2015 by the UK Business Angels Association. Blakey co-founded Avonmore Developments Ltd. in London in 2000, followed by Cub Capital Pte. Ltd. in Singapore in 2013. In 2016, Blakey joined William Klippgen to start Cocoon Capital - a venture capital firm targeting early-stage digital startups in Southeast Asia. The firm has so far raised two funds with an AUM of US$27m.

Education
Blakey holds a Bachelor of Arts degree from the College of William & Mary.

References

External links 
 Avonmore Developments Ltd.
 Cocoon Capital Partners Pte. Ltd.

Angel investors
English company founders
British expatriates in Singapore
1975 births
Living people
Businesspeople from London
Sainsbury family
College of William & Mary alumni
Economy of Singapore
British investors